Santala may refer to:

Jukka Santala (born 1985), Finnish football striker
Tommi Santala (born 1979), Finnish ice hockey player
Santala railway station in Hanko, Finland